"It's About Time" is a song by American rock band Young the Giant from the band's second studio album, Mind over Matter. It was released as the lead single from the album on October 28, 2013. A music video accompanying the song was released the same day.

In an interview with Rolling Stone, Young the Giant drummer Francois Comtois said that the track is "certainly the most aggressive song on the album. But it kind of came from this realization we could do what we wanted to do and be honest about it."

Charts

Weekly charts

Year-end charts

References

2013 songs
2013 singles
Young the Giant songs
Fueled by Ramen singles